Li Xingxian (born 24 March 2005) is a Chinese footballer currently playing as a forward for Guangzhou.

Career statistics

Club
.

References

2005 births
Living people
Chinese footballers
Association football forwards
Guangzhou F.C. players
Chinese Super League players
21st-century Chinese people